The Swiss Network Operators Group (SwiNOG) is a Swiss counterpart to NANOG. Like NANOG, SwiNOG operates a mailing list for operators of Swiss data networks, including ISPs.

Events
Twice a year the community gathers in Bern, the capitol of Switzerland for a social gathering containing technical presentations and of course direct interaction between the people in the community. Usually these talks are very technical and can contain various topics related to the work of network operators like out-of-band management. Of course there are also more high-level presentations like the one about SDN and NFV. Usually some months before the event, someone from the SwiNOG-Core-Team sends out a CfP.

On a monthly basis, Steven Glogger is also organizing the SwiNOG Beer Events. In the past there where already more than 100 events, taken place in the city of Zurich, a social gathering where people talk about technology, their employer and sometimes also about customers but mainly to exchange information to each other in an offline mode.

History

See also
 Internet network operators' group

References

External links 

SwiNOG Federation a non-profit organisation representing Swiss SME Internet access and service providers.

Internet in Switzerland
Internet Network Operators' Groups
Electronic_mailing_lists
Computer_networking
History_of_the_Internet
Information technology organisations based in Switzerland